Thomas O'Driscoll (1838–1891) was a New Zealand hotel-keeper and political agitator. He was born in Ash-hill, County Kerry, Ireland in 1838.

References

New Zealand hoteliers
Irish emigrants to New Zealand (before 1923)
People from County Kerry
1838 births
1891 deaths